Zhang Shuai was the defending champion, but chose not to participate.

Ekaterine Gorgodze won the title after defeating Sabina Sharipova 6–4, 6–1 in the final.

Seeds

Draw

Finals

Top half

Bottom half

References
Main Draw

President's Cup (tennis) - Singles
President's Cup (tennis)